Nikolai Aleksandrovich Bezzubov (11 December 1902 – 20 July 1943) was a Red Army colonel who held division command during World War II.

Early life and prewar service 
Nikolai Aleksandrovich Bezzubov was born on 11 December 1902 in the village of Zheludki, Kurilovskoy volost, Makaryevsky uyezd, Kostroma Governorate. Conscripted into the Red Army on 1 May 1924, Bezzubov was sent to the Galich Military Depot. From July to December he completed training at the divisional school of the 18th Rifle Division, then served as a squad leader and assistant platoon commander in the regimental school of the 54th Rifle Regiment of the division. Sent to study at the Ryazan Infantry School in September 1927, Bezzubov was appointed to the 131st Tarashcha Rifle Regiment of the 44th Rifle Division of the Ukrainian Military District upon his graduation in April 1930. With the 131st, he served successively as an assistant company commander for the political section, as commander and politruk of the machine gun training company, and as a battalion commander. 

Bezzubov left the division in June 1938 to serve as chief of the course for junior lieutenants of the 8th Rifle Corps at Zhitomir, and in November of that year transferred to the 243rd Rifle Regiment of the 81st Rifle Division of the Kiev Special Military District. After serving as a battalion commander and assistant regimental commander for personnel, he was appointed commander of the 556th Rifle Regiment of the 169th Rifle Division on 16 August 1939. The 169th became part of the 37th Rifle Corps of the 6th Army. In February 1940 then-Captain Bezzubov was seconded to the Novograd-Volynsky Infantry School to serve as a battalion commander, and in December sent to the Vystrel course to receive advanced training for regimental commanders.

World War II 
After Operation Barbarossa began, then-Major Bezzubov graduated from the course and was appointed commander of the 3rd Rifle Regiment of the 1st Moscow People's Militia Rifle Division (Leninsky District). After being brought up to strength and equipped, the division joined the 33rd Army of the Reserve Front and took positions in the region of Spas-Demensk, where it entered combat. In five days of fighting encircled by superior German forces, the division managed to inflict significant losses in manpower and equipment through a stubborn defense and constant counterattacks. In the region of Roslavl, the division broke out of encirclement and fought its way back to Soviet lines at Tarutino. The division was redesignated as the 60th Rifle Division on 26 September, and his regiment accordingly became the 1283rd Rifle Regiment. During the Vyazma defensive operation in early October, the division fought on the line of the Desna in the region of Kholmets, and in the face of the German advance retreated to the region northwest of Spas-Demensk.

Subsequently, Bezzubov took command of the 1289th Rifle Regiment of the 110th Rifle Division. With the 33rd Army of the Western Front, the division fought in the defense of Naro-Fominsk. In late October and early November the regiment operated as part of the 1st Guards Moscow Motor Rifle Division. In the battles for Naro-Fominsk, Bezzubov demonstrated "high organizational skill and forceful qualities, courage, fortitude, and bravery." Taking command of the division on 8 December, he led it in the Rzhev-Vyazma Offensive, during which it captured Vereya. In February 1942, the division entered the region southeast of Vyazma and in cooperation with the main forces attempted to capture the city. Bring up reserves, the German forces counterattacked and cut off part of the 33rd Army, including the 110th. Until July, the division fought in encirclement, then rejoined the main forces of the front in the region of Vyazma. After escaping the encirclement and screening, then-Colonel Bezzubov was placed at the disposal of the Personnel Department of the front to await a new assignment.

Appointed acting commander of the 10th Motor Rifle Brigade on 28 August, Bezzubov transferred to serve as deputy commander of the 303rd Rifle Division on 12 March 1943. With the 3rd Tank Army, the division fought in the Third Battle of Kharkov before joining the 57th Army of the Southwestern Front on 26 April. The division took up defenses on the eastern bank of the Seversky Donets from Krasny to Novodonovka in May. Bezzubov took command of the 100th Rifle Division on 28 June and led it as part of the 40th Army of the Voronezh Front, holding a defensive line on the Psel in the region of the fortified points of Belaya and Ivka. During the defensive phase of the Battle of Kursk, Bezzubov was mortally wounded and died of wounds on 20 July. His body was taken to the army and buried in a grave in Beloye, Kursk Oblast.

Awards 
Bezzubov was a recipient of the following decorations:

 Order of Lenin
 Order of the Red Banner (3)
 Order of the Red Star
 Medals

References

Citations

Bibliography 

 

1902 births
1943 deaths
People from Makaryevsky Uyezd (Kostroma Governorate)
Soviet colonels
Soviet military personnel killed in World War II
Recipients of the Order of Lenin
Recipients of the Order of the Red Banner
Recipients of the Order of the Red Star